Love Country Style is a studio album by Ray Charles, released in June 1970 on Charles' Tangerine Records label.

Track listing
LP side A: 
 "If You Were Mine" (Jimmy Lewis) – 3:47 
 "Ring of Fire" (June Carter Cash, Merle Kilgore) – 3:05 
 "Your Love is So Doggone Good" (Big Dee Irwin, Rudy Love) – 2:59 
 "Don’t Change On Me" (Eddie Reeves, Jimmy Holiday) – 3:22 
 "Till I Can’t Take It Anymore" (Clyde Otis, Dorian Burton) – 3:27  
LP side B: 
 "You’ve Still Got A Place In My Heart" (Leon Payne) – 4:45 
 "I Keep It Hid" (Jimmy Webb) – 3:46 
 "Sweet Memories" (Mickey Newbury) – 3:31 
 "Good Morning Dear" (Mickey Newbury) – 3:31 
 "Show Me The Sunshine" (Buddy Scott, Jimmy Radcliffe) – 3:12

Personnel
Ray Charles – keyboards, vocals
Sid Feller - arrangements, conductor
David T. Walker, Steve Guillory - guitar
Carol Kaye - electric bass
Technical
David Braithwaite, Ray Charles Robinson - engineer

References

External links 
Love Country Style at discogs.com

Ray Charles albums
1970 albums
Albums conducted by Sid Feller
Albums arranged by Sid Feller
ABC Records albums
Tangerine Records (1962) albums